Immunochemistry is the study of the chemistry of the immune system.  This involves the study of the properties, functions, interactions and production  of the chemical components (antibodies/immunoglobulins, toxin, epitopes of proteins like CD4, antitoxins, cytokines/chemokines, antigens) of the immune system. It also include immune responses and determination of immune materials/products  by immunochemical assays. 

In addition, immunochemistry is the study of the identities and functions of the components of the immune system. Immunochemistry is also used to describe the application of immune system components, in particular antibodies, to chemically labelled antigen molecules for visualization.

Various methods in immunochemistry have been developed and refined, and used in scientific study, from virology to molecular evolution. Immunochemical techniques include: enzyme-linked immunosorbent assay, immunoblotting (e.g., Western blot assay), precipitation and agglutination reactions, immunoelectrophoresis, immunophenotyping, immunochromatographic assay and cyflometry.

One of the earliest examples of immunochemistry is the Wasserman test to detect syphilis. Svante Arrhenius was also one of the pioneers in the field; he published Immunochemistry in 1907 which described the application of the methods of physical chemistry to the study of the theory of toxins and antitoxins.

Immunochemistry is also studied from the aspect of using antibodies to label epitopes of interest in cells (immunocytochemistry) or tissues (immunohistochemistry).

References

Branches of immunology